Kristoffer Sabransky Knudsen (born 19 February 1991) is a Danish badminton player. He was appointed as junior player coach at the Københavns Badminton Klub in 2018.

Achievements

BWF International Challenge/Series (2 titles, 9 runners-up) 
Men's doubles

Mixed doubles

  BWF International Challenge tournament
  BWF International Series tournament
  BWF Future Series tournament

References

External links 
 

1991 births
Living people
People from Kolding
Danish male badminton players
Badminton coaches
Sportspeople from the Region of Southern Denmark